Holger Becker (born 15 July 1964) is a German businessman and politician of the Social Democratic Party (SPD) who has been serving as a member of the Bundestag since the 2021 German federal election, representing the constituency of Jena – Sömmerda – Weimarer Land I.

Early life and education
Becker studied physics at the University of Heidelberg and at University of Western Australia in Perth from 1985 to 1991. He subsequently worked as a research associate at the University of Heidelberg and earned a doctorate (Dr. rer.nat.) in 1995. He was a research associate at Imperial College London from 1995 to 1997.

Career in the private sector
Becker worked at Jenoptik from 1998 until 2000.

Political career
In parliament, Becker has been serving on the Committee on Education, Research and Technology Assessment and the Committee on Digitization.

Other activities
 Helmholtz Association of German Research Centres, Ex-Officio Member of the Senate (since 2022)
 German Physical Society (DPG), Member of the Board (2000–2015, since 2021)
 Association of German Engineers (VDI), Member

References 

Living people
1964 births
Place of birth missing (living people)
Members of the Bundestag for the Social Democratic Party of Germany
Members of the Bundestag 2021–2025